Rakibul Islam (born 2 December 1997) is a Bangladeshi Twenty20 cricketer, who bats right-handed and bowls right-arm off-break. He currently represents the Old DOHS Sports Club in domestic T20 cricket.

In May 2021, he was named in the Old DOHS Sports Club's squad for the 2021 Dhaka Premier Division Twenty20 Cricket League. He made his Twenty20 debut for the Old DOHS Sports Club during the rain-affected second match of the tournament.

References

External links 

 

1997 births
Living people
Bangladeshi cricketers
Old DOHS Sports Club cricketers